Baliraajgadh is an archaeological site located in Madhubani district of Bihar, India. It has been claimed by some scholars to be the location of the ancient city of Mithila. The headquarter of the Ancient Mithila University was at the court of King Janaka in Mithila. Therefore, Balirajgadh is also the possible site of the Ancient Mithila University. It is the place from where most of the schools of the ancient Indian philosophy emerged. Nyaya Shastra, Logical sciences, Samkhya Shastra, Mimansa Shastra and many more Indian philosophy emerged from the Ancient Mithila University.

In Xuanzang's record, two clans were linked with Vajji/Mithila by 646: Vaishali and Vrijji. Vaishali was both Buddhist and Hindu while Vrijji was predominantly Hindu and the capital of it Zhanshuna (占戍挐, possibly from Sanskrit "Cemśoṇa/Cansuna").

Excavations 
In 1938 Archeological Survey of India declared the ancient site of Balirajgadh as a site of national importance under the Ancient Monuments Preservation Act of 1904. The first excavation of the site was conducted in 1962-1963 by the Archeological Survey of India. The second and third excavations was conducted by the Directorate of Archaeology and Museums, Government of Bihar, in 1972-73 and 1974-75. In 2013-2014, Archeological Survey of India, Bihar circle again started the excavation of the site but due to the negligence of the government no proper results were there.

Archeological Remains 
Archeologists have found many archeological remains from the site by excavations conducted by them. They excavated 2300 years old iron nail from the site. More than 400 antiquities were excavated from the site including human & animal figurines and beads of terracotta, bangle fragments and ceiling. The sizes of the bricks found at the ruins of the site are double compared with the sizes of the modern times bricks. The size of the bricks found here are generally 1 Feet × 1.5 Feet × 4 Inch in dimension.

History 
According to historians and local residents, it was the capital of ancient King Bali. King Bali was the son of Virochan and grandson of Prahlad. King Bali was very famous for his donations to poors, Brahmins, Scholars and any one who came to his kingdom in expectations for financial help. He is known as a great donar. Many scholars claimed that it was the capital of King Janaka in Mithila. According to Ramayana, Lord Rama, Lakshmana and Guru Vishwamitra went to the Kingdom of Mithila from Gautam Ashram in the direction of North-East direction. This site is in the North-East direction from the Gautam Ashram. In the Ramayana, the capital of the Kingdom of Mithila is also known as Mithilapuri. So, it is also believed as the site of ancient Mithilapuri in Ramayana. According to the historian Sahadev Jha, it was the capital of the Kingdom of Shakaditya in the 1st Century BC. Shakaditya was the younger brother of King Vikramaditya. In the 11th century AD, it was the capital of King Ballal sen of Sen dynasty. Some of the remains of Maurya period were also found here. So some scholars believe that some of the parts of this site may be built during Maurya period

References

Archaeological sites in Bihar